The molecular formula C4H4O2 may refer to:

Cycloprop-2-ene carboxylic acid
Diketene
Dioxins
1,2-Dioxin
1,4-Dioxin
2-Furanone
Methyl propiolate
Tetrolic acid